Puk Lyng Thomsen (born 15 April 1998) is a Danish amateur golfer. She won the 2017 French Ladies Amateur and finished second individually in the 2016 Espirito Santo Trophy.

Amateur career
Thomsen was born in Frederikshavn in 1998 and started playing golf when she was seven years old. At the age of 13, she was picked for the national team. By the time she accepted a golf scholarship to Florida State University in 2018, she was one of the most accomplished junior golfers in the world, and at 17th spot in the World Amateur Golf Rankings one of the top ranked players to ever sign for Florida State University.

Thomsen won the Danish Junior Matchplay Championship in 2011 and won her first international tournament in 2012, the Öijared Junior Open in Sweden. The next year, she appeared for Denmark in the European Young Masters and the European Girls' Team Championship. She appeared in the European Ladies' Team Championship six times between 2014 and 2019. In 2015, when it was held at Helsingør Golf Club in her home country, she won the individual stroke play qualifying event. She carded rounds of 71 and 65 to finish a single shot ahead of England's Alice Hewson and Finland's Matilda Castren, and in the process jumped into a tie for second place on the European Ranking behind leader Agathe Laisne.

As a result, Thomsen played for Team Europe in the 2015 Junior Solheim Cup held at Golf Club St. Leon-Rot in Germany. She also represented Europe in the Patsy Hankins Trophy against Asia/Pacific twice, in 2016 and 2018. In 2018, she was the only returning European player from 2016, along with Bianca Fabrizio and Frida Kinhult.

At the 2015 World Junior Girls Championship in Canada, she won the team silver, along with Cecilie Bofill and Line Toft Hansen. She finished in third place in the 2016 Portuguese International Ladies Amateur Championship, and third in the 2017 French International Lady Juniors Amateur Championship, where she shot a tournament personal best 3-under par 68 in the second round. She shot an all-tournament best 8-under par score of 64 in the final round to win the French International Ladies Amateur Championship ahead of Alessia Nobilio of Italy. She was runner-up in the European Nations Cup - Copa Sotogrande, in Spain.

In 2017, Thomsen also played in the Vagliano Trophy along with future fellow Seminole Morgane Metraux, and competed in the U.S. Women's Amateur. She finished in second place in the individual standings with a 12-under par total at the 2016 World Championships in Mexico, the 2016 Espirito Santo Trophy, and helped the Danish team with Marie Lund-Hansen and Malene Krølbøll Hansen secure fourth place.

Thomsen was one of five heralded recruits in head coach Amy Bond's best-ever recruiting class that arrived on the Florida State University campus in September of 2018, having turned down an offer from Oklahoma State University. She was a big part of a star-studded group of freshmen in the Florida State Seminoles women's golf team that included Frida Kinhult, Caroline Hodge, Amelia Williamson and Beatrice Wallin. With Thomsen in the lineup, Florida State tied the school-best for finishes in the ACC Championship (second) and the NCAA Auburn Regional Championship (second).

Thomsen's career was dealt a serious blow when a back injury she had been developing for six years got progressively worse. In the spring of 2020, she decided to end her Florida State Seminoles career after only two years, and moved back to Denmark for treatment. By May 2020, she couldn't even walk, and decided to undergo the same operation as Tiger Woods, a surgery designed to stabilize the lower part of her back. With the operation seemingly a success, following a year of rehabilitation, she competed in a small number of local tournaments in 2021.

Amateur wins
2011 Danish Junior Matchplay Championship
2012 Öijared Junior Open
2013 Danish Junior Championship
2014 DGU Elite Tour Damer 1
2015 Danish National Strokeplay Championship
2016 Danish National Strokeplay Championship
2017 French International Ladies Amateur Championship, DGU Elite Tour 1, DGU Elite Tour Finale
2019 Danish International Ladies Amateur Championship

Sources:

Team appearances
Amateur
European Young Masters (representing Denmark): 2013, 2014
European Girls' Team Championship (representing Denmark): 2013
European Ladies' Team Championship (representing Denmark): 2014, 2015, 2016, 2017, 2018, 2019
Junior Solheim Cup (representing Europe): 2015
Patsy Hankins Trophy (representing Europe): 2016, 2018
Vagliano Trophy (representing the Continent of Europe): 2017 (winners)
Espirito Santo Trophy (representing Denmark): 2016

References

External links
Puk Lyng Thomsen at the Florida State Seminoles women's golf official site 

Danish female golfers
Florida State Seminoles women's golfers
Sportspeople from the North Jutland Region
People from Frederikshavn
1998 births
Living people